Peter Avanzino (born May 26, 1962) is an American animation director. He has directed several episodes of Futurama, and served as supervising director on the 6th and 7th seasons of the series. Avanzino works for Rough Draft Studios in Glendale, California. He has also directed episodes of Drawn Together, Duckman, The Wild Thornberrys, Sit Down, Shut Up, and The Ren & Stimpy Show. He was also a storyboard artist on The Ren & Stimpy Show and The Simpsons. Also, he directed the Christmas movie "How Murray Saved Christmas." Avanzino currently resides in Los Angeles, California with his wife and kids.

Credits

Supervising Director
 Baby Blues (unaired second season)
 Drawn Together
 Napoleon Dynamite
 Sit Down, Shut Up (with Rich Moore)
 Futurama (seasons 6-present)
 Clash-a-Rama (season one)
 Disenchantment (with Dwayne Carey-Hill)

Director
 How Murray Saved Christmas 2014

Sit Down, Shut Up
"Helen and Sue's High School Reunion"

Drawn Together
 "Hot Tub"
 "The Other Cousin"
 "Super Nanny"
 "A Very Special Drawn Together Afterschool Special"
 "Lost in Parking Space, Part One"

Duckman
 A Room with a Bellevue
 The Once and Future Duck
 Aged Heat 2: Women in Heat
 From Brad to Worse
 Ajax and Ajaxer
 Duckman and Cornfed in 'Haunted Society Plumbers'
 My Feral Lady
 Das Sub
 Class Warfare

Futurama
 "The Series Has Landed"
 "A Flight to Remember"
 "Fear of a Bot Planet" (co-directed with Carlos Baeza, Ashley Lenz and Chris Sauve)
 "Xmas Story"
 "Bender Gets Made"
 "Parasites Lost"
 "Insane in the Mainframe"
 "Crimes of the Hot"
 "Spanish Fry"
 Futurama: The Beast with a Billion Backs
 Futurama: Into the Wild Green Yonder
 "The Late Philip J. Fry" Which he won a Prime Time Emmy *"Primetime Emmy Award for Outstanding Animated Program (for Programming Less Than One Hour)#2010s for
 "Reincarnation"
 "The Six Million Dollar Mon"
 "Meanwhile"

The Ren & Stimpy Show
 "Stimpy's Fan Club"

Disenchantment
 "Love's Tender Rampage"
 "Tiabeanie Falls"

References 

 

American animators
Living people
1962 births
American television directors
American animated film directors
American storyboard artists